The canton of Montval-sur-Loir (before 2021: Château-du-Loir) is an administrative division of the Sarthe department, northwestern France. Its borders were modified at the French canton reorganisation which came into effect in March 2015. Its seat is in Montval-sur-Loir.

It consists of the following communes:
 
Beaumont-Pied-de-Bœuf
Beaumont-sur-Dême
Chahaignes
La Chartre-sur-le-Loir
Courdemanche
Dissay-sous-Courcillon
Flée
Le Grand-Lucé
Jupilles
Lavernat
Lhomme
Loir en Vallée
Luceau
Marçon
Montreuil-le-Henri
Montval-sur-Loir
Nogent-sur-Loir
Pruillé-l'Éguillé
Saint-Georges-de-la-Couée
Saint-Pierre-de-Chevillé
Saint-Pierre-du-Lorouër
Saint-Vincent-du-Lorouër
Thoiré-sur-Dinan
Villaines-sous-Lucé

References

Cantons of Sarthe